Barkman is a surname. Notable people with the surname include:

Frances Barkman (1885–1946), Jewish Australian schoolteacher and community worker
Gerd Barkman, New Zealand sport shooter
Jane Barkman (born 1951), American swimmer
Jon Barkman (born 1979), Canadian ice hockey player
Leonard Barkman (1920–1979), Canadian politician
Ralph Barkman (1907–1998), American football player

Russian Mennonite surnames